Margetshöchheim is a municipality in the district of Würzburg in Bavaria, Germany. It lies on the left bank of the river Main.

References

Würzburg (district)